Lee Sang-hyeob (born 1 January 1990) is a South Korean footballer who plays as a midfielder for Paju Citizen FC.

He debuted on July 7, 2013 in K League Classic and was praised for his good play by South Korea Football legend Cha Bum-kun.
 
His role model is Ha Dae-sung and he is the rising star of FC Seoul.

He was in the squad for the 2013 AFC Champions League Final but did not play in that match.

References

External links 
 

1990 births
Living people
Association football midfielders
South Korean footballers
FC Seoul players
Gimcheon Sangmu FC players
Incheon United FC players
K League 1 players
Sportspeople from Incheon